Club Deportivo Alfredo Salinas is a Peruvian football club from the Espinar District, Espinar Province, in Cuzco, Perú. It currently plays in the Peruvian Segunda División.

History
It was founded in 2011 in honor of the deceased mayor of Espinar, Alfredo Salinas Pérez who died in an accident in 2008.

In 2015 it won the Liga Departamental de Cusco and made it to the semifinals of the 2015 Copa Perú national stage. Because of its good performance it was invited to play in the 2016 Peruvian Segunda División.

Current squad

Honours

Regional
Liga Departamental del Cusco:
Winners (1): 2015

Liga Provincial de Espinar:
Runner-up (1): 2015

Liga Distrital de Yauri:
Winners (1): 2015

References

Football clubs in Peru